A by-thirds Hyndburn Borough Council local election, was held on Thursday 2 May 2019. Approximately one third of the local council's 35 seats fell up for election on that day.

Background
Before the election Labour had a majority of 26 councillors, Conservatives had 9 councillors.

Council composition
Prior to the election the composition of the council was:

Labour 26
Conservative 9

Labour defended 9-seats and Conservatives defended 3-seats.

No candidates stood as potential Green or Independents councillors, in any Hyndburn ward, but UKIP candidates stood across only 2 wards.

Local Election result
The majority grouping of councillors as the headline result of the election, was unchanged; with Labour retaining an overall 26-seat majority, but with two seats switching hands, one from Labour to Conservative, one from Conservative to Labour.

After the election, the composition of the council's 35 seats was -

Labour 26
Conservative 9

Reference: https://en.wikipedia.org/wiki/2015_Hyndburn_Borough_Council_election

NB: Four (of the 16) Council wards, where seats will NOT be up for re-election in 2019, include the following wards - Netherton, Peel, Spring Hill and St. Andrews' in Oswaldtwistle.

Previous Councillors who were Standing-Down in this election included - Clare Cleary (Lab) (Rishton).

Ward results

Altham

Barnfield

Baxenden

Central

Church

Clayton-le-Moors

Huncoat

Immanuel

Milnshaw

Overton

Rishton

St Oswald's

References

BBC Election 2019 Hyndburn Borough Council results
Hyndburn Borough Council - 2019 election results
What are the Hyndburn Council local election 2019 results?

Hyndburn Borough Council election
2019
2010s in Lancashire
May 2019 events in the United Kingdom